The Alba AR3, and its derivative, the Alba AR3-001, were a series of ground effect IMSA GTP/Group C junior (C2) sports prototype race car, designed, developed and built by Italian manufacturer and constructor, Alba Engineering in 1984, and used in sports car racing until 1988. Its best result was two 4th-place finishes; first at Lime Rock in 1984, being driven by Gianpiero Moretti, and the second at Kyalami in 1987, being driven by Maurizio Gellini and Ranieri Randaccio. It was powered by a number of different engines, including a naturally-aspirated  Buick V6 engine, a turbocharged  Buick Indy V6 engine, a  Mazda 13B 2-rotor wankel rotary engine, a naturally-aspirated  Ford-Cosworth DFV Formula One engine, and a derived  Ford-Cosworth DFL.

An evolution of the AR3 and AR3-001, called the Alba AR4, was introduced in 1985, and used in sports car racing until 1989. It was powered by the same  Mazda 13B 2-rotor wankel rotary engine as its predecessor, and achieved 2 class wins.

References

Le Mans Prototypes
24 Hours of Le Mans race cars
Ford vehicles
Rear-wheel-drive vehicles
Mid-engined cars
Sports prototypes
Cars introduced in 1984
Cars of Italy
Group C cars
IMSA GTP cars